Football Club Mwangaza is a Congolese football club based in Beni, North Kivu province and currently playing in the Linafoot Ligue 2, the second level of the Congolese football.

References

Football clubs in the Democratic Republic of the Congo
Goma